Chakarteh (also Romanized as Chākarteh; also known as Chāh Kartū) is a village in Fin Rural District, Fin District, Bandar Abbas County, Hormozgan Province, Iran. At the 2006 census, its population was 77, in 15 families.

References 

Populated places in Bandar Abbas County